Quiwe Baarsen (died 1627), was a Sami shaman. He was one of 26 Sami people executed for witch craft in Norway in the 17th century.

Baarsen was a Noaidi and a resident in Aarøya.

In May 1627, he was put on trial in Hasvåg accused of having procured wind by use of magic for the sailor Niels Jonsen in 1625.

Baarsen claimed to have acted on commission of Jonsen, who needed wind to sail to Hasvåg, and described that he had wet his feet in water to create wind. Afterward, he was asked to repeat it by the wife of one of Jonsen's fishermen, which he did by throwing a pig into the sea. That time, however, the wind grew into a storm which caused the boat to sink. Baarsen explained that he was often hired to create wind. He denied having performed magic by the use of a Sami drum, but admitted that he had the knowledge to do so.

On 11 May 1627, Quiwe Baarsen was judged guilty of having caused five people to drown by the wind he had created by use of magic, and sentenced to be executed by burning.

See also 
 Lars Nilsson (shaman)
 Erik Eskilsson
 Christianization of the Sámi people

References 

 Rune Blix Hagen: THE SHAMAN OF ALTA. THE 1627 WITCH TRIAL OF QUIWE BAARSEN

Executed Norwegian people
Norwegian Sámi people
People executed for heresy
16th-century births
1627 deaths
Persecution of Sámi people
Norwegian Sámi shamans
People executed by Norway by burning
People in Sámi history
17th-century executions by Norway
Witch trials in Norway
Pagan martyrs